Vascular endothelial growth factor C (VEGF-C) is a protein that is a member of the platelet-derived growth factor / vascular endothelial growth factor (PDGF/VEGF) family. It is encoded in humans by the VEGFC gene, which is located on chromosome 4q34.

Functions 
The main function of VEGF-C is to promote the growth of lymphatic vessels (lymphangiogenesis). It acts on lymphatic endothelial cells (LECs) primarily via its receptor VEGFR-3 promoting survival, growth and migration. It was discovered in 1996 as a ligand for the orphan receptor VEGFR-3. Soon thereafter, it was shown to be a specific growth factor for lymphatic vessels in a variety of models. However, in addition to its effect on lymphatic vessels, it can also promote the growth of blood vessels and regulate their permeability. The effect on blood vessels can be mediated via its primary receptor VEGFR-3 or its secondary receptor VEGFR-2. Apart from vascular targets, VEGF-C is also important for neural development and blood pressure regulation.

Biosynthesis
VEGF-C is a dimeric, secreted protein, which undergoes a complex proteolytic maturation resulting in multiple processed forms. After translation, VEGF-C consists of three domains: the central VEGF homology domain (VHD), the N-terminal domain (propeptide) and a C-terminal domain (propeptide). It is referred to as "uncleaved VEGF-C" and has a size of approximately 58 kDa. The first cleavage (which happens already before secretion) occurs between the VHD and the C-terminal domain and is mediated by proprotein convertases. However, the resulting protein is still held together by disulfide bonds and remains inactive (although it can bind already VEGFR-3). This form is referred to as "intermediate form" or pro-VEGF-C and it consists of two polypeptide chains of 29 and 31 kDa. In order to activate VEGF-C, a second cleavage has to occur between the N-terminal propeptide and the VHD. This cleavage can be performed either by ADAMTS3, plasmin, KLK3/PSA or cathepsin D. With progressing maturation, the affinity of VEGF-C for both VEGFR-2 and VEGFR-3 increases and only the fully processed, mature forms of VEGF-C have a significant affinity for VEGFR-2.

Relationship to VEGF-D 
The closest structural and functional relative of VEGF-C is VEGF-D. However, at least in mice, VEGF-C is absolutely essential for the development of the lymphatic system, whereas VEGF-D appears to be unnecessary. Whether this holds true for humans is unknown, because there are major differences between human and mouse VEGF-D.

Disease relevance
In a minority of lymphedema patients, the condition is caused by mutations in the VEGFC gene and VEGF-C is a potential treatment for lymphedema, even though the underlying molecular cause appears more often in the VEGF-Receptor-3 instead of VEGF-C itself. Because in Milroy's disease (Hereditary lymphedema type I), only one allele is mutated, not all VEGFR-3 molecules are non-functional and it is thought, that high amounts of VEGF-C can compensate for the mutated, nonfunctional receptors by increasing the signaling levels of the remaining functional receptors. Therefore VEGF-C is developed as a lymphedema drug under the name of Lymfactin. Also indirectly VEGF-C can be responsible for hereditary lymphedema: The rare Hennekam syndrome can result from the inability of the mutated CCBE1 to assist the ADAMTS3 protease in activating VEGF-C. While lack of VEGF-C results in lymphedema, VEGF-C production is implicated in tumor lymphangiogenesis and metastasis. Expression of VEGF-C by tumors induces peri-tumoral and intratumoral lymphangiogenesis what potently promotes metastatic dissemination of tumor cells. VEGF-C primarily stimulates lymphangiogenesis by activating VEGFR-3, yet under certain conditions it can also act directly on blood vessels to promote tumor angiogenesis.

Evolution
The PDGF family is so closely related to the VEGF family that the two are sometimes grouped together as the PDGF/VEGF family. In invertebrates, molecules from this families are not easily distinguished from each other and are collectively referred to as PVFs (PDGF/VEGF-like growth factors. The comparison of human VEGFs with these PVFs allows conclusions on the structure of the ancestral molecules, which appear more closely related to today's lymphangiogenic VEGF-C than to the other members of the VEGF family and despite their large evolutionary distance are still able to interact with human VEGF receptors. The PVFs in Drosophila melanogaster have functions for the migration of hemocytes and the PVFs in the jellyfish Podocoryne carnea for the development of the tentacles and the gastrovascular apparatus. However, the function of the PVF-1 of the nematode Caenorhabditis elegans is unknown

References

Further reading

External links 
 

Genes associated with cancer